Woolooware railway station is located on the Cronulla line, serving the Sydney suburb of Woolooware. It is served by Sydney Trains T4 line services.

History
Woolooware station opened on 16 December 1939 when the Cronulla line opened from Sutherland to Cronulla. In April 2010, the line from Caringbah to Cronulla was duplicated which saw the side platform at Woolooware converted to an island platform as part of the Rail Clearways Program.

Platforms & services

Transport links
Woolooware station is served by one NightRide route:
N11: Cronulla station to Town Hall station

References

External links

Photo gallery showing construction of the Cronulla Line duplication
Woolooware station details Transport for New South Wales

Easy Access railway stations in Sydney
Railway stations in Sydney
Railway stations in Australia opened in 1939
Cronulla railway line
Sutherland Shire